Cheche Lazaro Presents is a Philippine television documentary series broadcast by GMA Network. Hosted by Cheche Lazaro, it premiered on February 14, 1999 and concluded on June 22, 2003. The show aired occasionally on ABS-CBN from 2010 to 2014.

References

1999 Philippine television series debuts
2014 Philippine television series endings
ABS-CBN News and Current Affairs shows
ABS-CBN original programming
Filipino-language television shows
GMA Network original programming
GMA Integrated News and Public Affairs shows
Philippine documentary television series